Fenbendazole is a broad spectrum benzimidazole anthelmintic used against gastrointestinal parasites including: giardia, roundworms, hookworms, whipworms, the tapeworm genus Taenia (but not effective against Dipylidium caninum, a common dog tapeworm), pinworms, aelurostrongylus, paragonimiasis, strongyles, and strongyloides that can be administered to sheep, cattle, horses, fish, dogs, cats, rabbits, most reptiles, freshwater shrimp tanks as planaria and hydra treatments, as well as seals.

Drug interactions
Drug interactions may occur if salicylanilides such as dibromsalan and niclosamide are co-administered. Abortions in cattle and death in sheep have been reported after using these medications together. Abortions in domestic ruminants have been associated with concurrent use of anti-trematode therapeutic agents.

Toxicity

Fenbendazole is poorly absorbed from the gastrointestinal tract in most species. The  in laboratory animals exceeds 10 g/kg when administered orally.

Metabolism 
Fenbendazole is metabolized in the liver to oxfendazole, which is anthelmintic too; oxfendazole partially gets reduced back to fenbendazole in the liver and rumen. Also, fenbendazole itself is an active metabolite of another anthelmintic drug, febantel.

See also
 Oxfendazole
 Nocodazole
 Praziquantel

References

Anthelmintics
Thioethers
Benzimidazoles
Carbamates
Veterinary drugs